Madi Muratuly Zhakipbayev (born 21 March 2000) is a Kazakh footballer who plays as a midfielder.

References

Living people
2000 births
Kazakhstani footballers
Association football midfielders
FC Astana players
Kazakhstan Premier League players